Galda de Jos is a commune located in Alba County, Transylvania, Romania. It is composed of eleven villages: Benic (Borosbenedek), Cetea (Csáklya), Galda de Jos (Alsógáld), Galda de Sus (Felsőgáld), Lupșeni, Măgura, Mesentea (Kismindszent), Oiejdea (Vajasd), Poiana Galdei, Răicani (Rajkány), and Zăgriș.

See also
List of massacres in Romania for 1849 massacre of Hungarians

References

Communes in Alba County
Localities in Transylvania